is an upcoming mecha-based vehicular combat game developed by FromSoftware and published by Bandai Namco Entertainment. The first entry in the Armored Core series since Armored Core: Verdict Day (2013), it is set to be released for PlayStation 4, PlayStation 5, Windows, Xbox One, and Xbox Series X/S in 2023.

Story
Armored Core VI is set on a distant planet, Rubicon 3. There, humanity found a new energy source which could dramatically increase its technological capabilities. However, this substance instead caused a cataclysmic event, engulfing the entire star system in flames. After its rediscovery a half century later, humanity once again attempts to gain control over this mysterious resource. The player controls an independent mercenary piloting one of the titular Armored Cores, taking on jobs from extra-terrestrial mega-corporations and opposing resistance groups.

Development
In September 2016, FromSoftware president Hidetaka Miyazaki mentioned that a new entry in the Armored Core series was in early development. In January 2022, the development of a potential new installment of the Armored Core series was leaked due to a focus test. The game was formally announced at The Game Awards 2022 in December. It is being directed by Masaru Yamamura, his debut in the role after being a lead game designer on Sekiro: Shadows Die Twice. He took over from Miyazaki, who had led the development initially. Yasunori Ogura will serve as the game's producer.  Miyazaki and Yamamura clarified that they had not been making an intentional effort to push the game towards a Soulslike style of gameplay.

Notes

References

External links

Upcoming video games scheduled for 2023
Armored Core
Video games about mecha
Bandai Namco games
FromSoftware games
PlayStation 4 games
PlayStation 4 Pro enhanced games
PlayStation 5 games
Third-person shooters
Video game sequels
Multiplayer and single-player video games
Video games developed in Japan
Video games set in the future
Xbox One X enhanced games
Xbox One games
Xbox Series X and Series S games
Windows games
Video games set on fictional planets